SB-334867 is an orexin antagonist. It was the first non-peptide antagonist developed that is selective for the orexin receptor subtype OX1, with around 50x selectivity for OX1 over OX2 receptors. It has been shown to produce sedative and anorectic effects in animals, and has been useful in characterising the orexinergic regulation of brain systems involved with appetite and sleep, as well as other physiological processes. The hydrochloride salt of SB-334867 has been demonstrated to be hydrolytically unstable, both in solution and as the solid. Orexin antagonists have multiple potential clinical applications including the treatment of drug addiction, insomnia, obesity and diabetes.

References 

Sedatives
Orexin antagonists
Benzoxazoles
Naphthyridines
Ureas